This is a list of insurance companies based in the United States. These are companies with a strong national or regional presence having insurance as their primary business.

In 1752, Benjamin Franklin founded the first American insurance company as Philadelphia Contributionship. In 1820, there were 17 stock life insurance companies in the state of New York, many of which would subsequently fail. Between 1870 and 1872, 33 US life insurance companies failed, in part fueled by bad practices and incidents such as the Great Chicago Fire of 1871. 3,800 property-liability and 2,270 life insurance companies were operating in the United States by 1989.

U.S. insurance companies

Property and casualty insurance

Life and annuity 

 Aflac
 Allianz Life
 Allstate
 American Family Insurance
 American Fidelity Assurance
 American Income Life Insurance Company
 Ameritas Life Insurance Company
 Amica Mutual Insurance
 Assurity Life Insurance Company
 AXA Equitable Life Insurance Company
 Bankers Life and Casualty
 Banner Life Insurance Company
 Colonial Life & Accident Insurance Company
 Colonial Penn
 Conseco
 Farmers Insurance Group
 Garden State Life
 Genworth Financial
 The Great-West Life Assurance Company
 Gerber Life Insurance Company
 Globe Life And Accident Insurance Company
 The Guardian Life Insurance Company of America
 Horace Mann Educators Corporation
 ING Group
 Jackson National Life
 John Hancock Life Insurance
 Kansas City Life Insurance Company
 Lincoln National Corporation
 Manhattan Life Insurance Company
 MEGA Life and Health Insurance
 MetLife
 Mutual of Omaha
 National Life Group
 National Western Life Insurance Company
 Nationwide Mutual Insurance Company
 New York Life Insurance Company
 Ohio National Financial Services Company
 Pacific Life
 Primerica
 Protective Life
 Prudential Financial
 Securian Financial Group
 Standard Insurance Company
 State Farm Insurance
 Thrivent
 TIAA-CREF
 Transamerica Corporation
 UNIFI Companies
 United of Omaha
 Western & Southern Financial Group

Health insurance (major medical insurance) 

 AARP
 Aetna
 American Family Insurance
 American National Insurance Company
 Amerigroup
 Blue Cross and Blue Shield Association
 Bright Health
 CareSource
 Cambia Health Solutions
 Centene Corporation
 Cigna
 Compass Rose Benefits Group
 Coventry Health Care
 Delta Dental
 Elevance Health
 EmblemHealth
 Fortis
 Geisinger
 Golden Rule Insurance Company
 Group Health Cooperative
 Group Health Incorporated
Harvard Pilgrim Health Care
Healthcare Highways
 Health Net
 HealthMarkets
 HealthPartners
 HealthSpring
 Highmark
 Horace Mann Educators Corporation
 Humana
 Independence Blue Cross
 Kaiser Permanente
 Kaleida Health
 Liberty Medical
 MassHealth
 Medical Mutual of Ohio
 MEGA Life and Health Insurance
 Molina Healthcare
 Oscar Health
 Oxford Health Plans
 Premera Blue Cross
 Principal Financial Group
 Shelter Insurance
 State Farm
 Thrivent Financial for Lutherans
 UnitedHealth Group
 Unitrin
 Universal American Corporation
 WellCare
10Insurances

Medicare 

 Aetna
 American Family Insurance
 Bankers Life and Casualty
 CareSource
 Conseco
 Fidelis Care
 Kaiser Permanente
 Mutual of Omaha
 Premera Blue Cross
 Thrivent Financial for Lutherans
 United American Insurance Company

Workers' compensation 

Texas Mutual
 Accident Fund Insurance Company of America
 American International Group (AIG)
 AmTrust Financial Services
 Cincinnati Financial Corporation
 Erie Insurance Group
 Great West Casualty Company
 GUARD Insurance Group
 Hanover Insurance
 The Hartford
 Liberty Mutual
 Merchants Insurance Group
 Missouri Employers Mutual
 Nationwide Mutual Insurance Company
 New York State Insurance Fund
 The Norfolk & Dedham Group
 Penn National Insurance
 Pinnacol Assurance
 Puerto Rico State Insurance Fund
 Sentry Insurance
 Society Insurance
 State Farm Insurance
 State Compensation Insurance Fund
 United Heartland
 Zenith Insurance Group

See also

List of Canadian insurance companies

References

 
Insurance
United States